Roland Alexandre (6 November 1927 – 1 February 1956) was a French stage and film actor. Having established himself at the Comédie-Française, he appeared in eleven films before his early death by suicide. In 1954 he portrayed the composer Gioachino Rossini in the film House of Ricordi.

Selected filmography
 Great Man (1951)
 The Lady of the Camellias (1953)
 House of Ricordi (1954)
 Das Fräulein von Scuderi (1955)

References

Bibliography
 Mitchell, Charles P. The Great Composers Portrayed on Film, 1913 through 2002. McFarland, 2004.

External links

1927 births
French male stage actors
French male film actors
Male actors from Paris
1956 suicides
Suicides in France